Festuca abyssinica is a species of grass which is endemic to Africa.

Description
It also has a hairy callus and scaberulous palea keels.

The glumes are lanceolate, membranous, and keelless, have acute apexes, with the only difference being in size. Lemma itself is muticous with acute apex. The fruits are caryopses with an additional pericarp, which just like flowers is hairy as well. Hilum is linear.

Habitat and distribution
Festuca abyssinica grows in mountain grasslands, generally in moist and often peaty soils.  

It ranges along the mountains of eastern Africa, from Ethiopia through Kenya, Uganda, Tanzania, eastern Democratic Republic of the Congo, Rwanda, Burundi, Malawi, Mozambique, and Zambia to eastern Zimbabwe, and in the Tibesti Mountains of Chad, the Cameroon Highlands of Cameroon, Bioko, and the highlands of Angola.

References

abyssinica
Bunchgrasses of Africa
Afromontane flora